Rogers Hometown Hockey is a former package of National Hockey League (NHL) telecasts aired by Sportsnet as part of its national broadcast rights to the league. Debuting on October 12, 2014 as part of Sportsnet's inaugural season of coverage, the games featured a pre-game show and studio segments hosted on-location by Ron MacLean and Tara Slone from various Canadian cities, profiling local players and communities (including at the "grassroots" level). Each tour stop featured a weekend festival with community activities, culminating with the live broadcast. Hometown Hockey was spun off from prior NHL initiatives promoting hockey at the local level, and served as one of Sportsnet's three exclusive national windows (alongside the flagship Scotiabank Wednesday Night Hockey and Hockey Night in Canada), and one of two with a "game of the week" format.

The games were first aired on Sunday nights on Citytv, after which they moved to Sportsnet beginning in the 2015–16 season. The tour was suspended in March 2020 due to the COVID-19 pandemic, and Hometown Hockey was suspended as a whole during the shortened 2020–21 NHL season (with Hometown Hockey segments instead airing during Hockey Night). Hometown Hockey returned with a new Monday-night scheduling for the 2021–22 NHL season, after which it was replaced with Rogers Monday Night Hockey the following season.

Format 
The games were co-hosted on-location by Ron MacLean and Tara Slone from various Canadian cities as part of a nationwide tour. The pre-game show and studio segments for the games featured segments profiling local players and teams from each city. 

At least one Canadian-based franchise was featured during each game, although it sometimes also aired a game between two American-based teams if necessary. Most Hometown Hockey games were aired in primetime, although it occasionally aired in the afternoon (such as the second half of the Montreal Canadiens' traditional matinee games on the weekend of the Super Bowl; typically no other games were scheduled that evening).

History 

The games and tour contributed to an effort by Rogers to improve its public image, particularly under CEO Guy Laurence, by associating itself with the sport of hockey at a local level. MacLean characterized Hometown Hockey as an extension of Hockey Day in Canada and the Kraft Hockeyville competition—highlighting grassroots hockey throughout the country on a weekly basis. He also felt that the original Sunday night timeslot was "a good hockey night", believing that it could be "[a] family-forward way of doing the show to get the kids involved. Families can have it on while they get ready for school or work Sunday night. For me, after 27 years, honestly, what’s wrong with doing something different?" The games also sought to emulate the success of ESPN's College GameDay, and NBC's Sunday Night Football—which originally aired Sundays against Hometown Hockey during the National Football League season.

The games were carried by Citytv during its inaugural season (with London, Ontario as its inaugural city), although infrequently moved to Sportsnet in the event of scheduling conflicts. Beginning in the 2015–16 season, Hometown Hockey moved exclusively to Sportsnet; Moore explained that introducing Hometown Hockey on Citytv was intended to incubate the brand, but that airing it on Sportsnet had made sense from an economic standpoint due to its status as a pay channel, and enabled Citytv to return to entertainment programming on Sundays.

On March 8, 2020, in recognition of International Women's Day, the Hometown Hockey game that night featured the first all-female broadcast team in NHL history—with play-by-play commentator Leah Hextall, analyst Cassie Campbell-Pascall, and sideline reporter Christine Simpson. Women also served as the executive producer, game producer and director for the telecast.

Due to the COVID-19 pandemic, the Hometown Hockey games and tour were suspended for the 2020–21 NHL season. Two Sunday night Ottawa Senators games (one against the Montreal Canadiens and one against the Toronto Maple Leafs) were produced nationally under the NHL on Sportsnet banner in lieu of regional rightsholder TSN. A branded segment and virtual audience was featured during Hockey Night in Canada.

Beginning with the 2021–22 season, Hometown Hockey broadcasts were moved to Monday nights. Due to the reinstatement of COVID-19 restrictions nationwide due to Omicron variant, the tour was suspended from December 2021 until March 2022.

On June 28, 2022, Rogers cancelled Hometown Hockey after eight seasons; the games were replaced with Rogers Monday Night Hockey the following season. MacLean remains with Sportsnet to host Hockey Night.

Indigenous representation
On March 24, 2019, the Hometown Hockey was broadcast from First Nations territory for the first time, visiting the Enoch Cree Nation outside of Edmonton. Ahead of the game, Rogers announced a partnership with the Aboriginal Peoples Television Network (APTN) to simulcast that night's game with commentary in Plains Cree. It was the first-ever NHL broadcast in the language: Clarence Iron of Pinehouse, Saskatchewan's CFNK-FM (who is known locally for his radio broadcasts of indigenous teams in the language) served as the play-by-play announcer, while former NHL player John Chabot and Northern Cree member Earl Wood hosted the studio segments.

In December 2019, it was announced that Sportsnet and APTN would continue the broadcasts, with six Sunday-night games planned per-season over the next three years. The expanded package began with a Montreal Canadiens/Florida Panthers game in February 2020. On March 1, 2020, the tour broadcast from the Peguis First Nation in Manitoba.

Awards
In 2017 and 2018, Ron MacLean was nominated for Best Sports Host at the 5th Canadian Screen Awards and the 6th Canadian Screen Awards respectively.

In 2020, the Hometown Hockey broadcast from Enoch Cree Nation was nominated in the Best Sports Program or Segment category at the 8th Canadian Screen Awards.

Season 1 Overview
In season 1, the tour kicked off in London, Ontario, home of the London Knights. Live tour musical performances included appearances by:
 Blue Rodeo (Saskatoon)
 Sarah Harmer (Kingston)
 Paul Brandt (Lethbridge)

Season 2 Overview
In season 2, the tour kicked off in Kitchener, Ontario, home of the Kitchener Rangers. Live tour musical performances included appearances by:
 Barenaked Ladies (Kitchener)
 Rankin Family (Sydney)
 The Tenors (Sarnia)
 Tim Hicks (Oshawa)
 Coleman Hell (Thunder Bay)
 Scott Helman (Penticton) 
 Jess Moskaluke (Prince Albert)
 Gord Bamford (Calgary)

Season 3 Overview
In season 3, the tour kicked off in Newmarket, Ontario, home of Connor McDavid. Live tour musical performances included appearances by:
 Walk Off the Earth (Newmarket)
 Sam Roberts (Montreal)
 Suzie McNeil (Milton)
 Jason Blaine (Petawawa)
 Paul Brandt (Cochrane)
 USS (Edmonton)
 Kathleen Edwards (Ottawa)
 Tara Slone's Joydrop (Guelph)
 Tom Cochrane (Hamilton)

Season 4 Overview
In season 4, the tour kicks off in Niagara Falls, Ontario, home of Derek Sanderson. Live tour musical performances include appearances by:
 Tim Hicks (Niagara Falls)
 Matt Mays (Truro)
 Bleeker (Orillia)
 Brett Kissel (Airdrie)
 The Northern Pikes (Spruce Grove)
 54-40 (Cowichan Valley)
 Nice Horse (Lacombe)
 Paul Brandt (Canmore)
 Jess Moskaluke (Regina)
 Steven Page and The Transcanada Highwaymen (Belleville)
 Ferraro (Markham)
 Skydiggers (Brampton)
 Cold Creek County (Cornwall)
 Jonas & The Massive Attraction (Montreal)

Season 5 Overview
In season 5, the tour kicks off in Kitchener, Ontario, home of Hockey Hall of Famer Scott Stevens. Live tour musical performances include appearances by:
 The Pursuit of Happiness (Kitchener)
 Walk Off the Earth (Burlington)
 The Trews (Glace Bay)
 The Men of the Deeps (Glace Bay)
 Carolina East (Mount Pearl)
 Beverley Mahood (Aurora)
 Kelsi Mayne (Chatham-Kent)
 Jim Cuddy (Mississauga)
 The Road Hammers (Strathcona County)
 Gord Bamford (Leduc)
 The Dudes (Okotoks)
 Doc Walker (Winkler)

Season 6 Overview
In season 6, the tour kicked off in Halton Hills, Ontario, home of former NHL Director of Officiating Bryan Lewis. Live broadcast musical performers included:

 Shawn Hook (Ottawa)
 William Prince (Peguis First Nation)

Season 7 Overview
Due to the COVID-19 pandemic, the tour was suspended, as were the Hometown Hockey-themed Sunday national games. During Hockey Night in Canada, a branded segment and virtual audience was featured for the duration of the 2020-21 NHL regular season.

Season 8 Overview
In season 8, the tour resumed, kicking off in Ayr, Ontario in North Dumfries, home of NHLers Jay Wells and Kyle Clifford.

Series overview

 : During season 7, Rogers Hometown Hockey became an in-studio segment in Toronto on Saturday nights during Hockey Night in Canada due to the COVID-19 pandemic. While there were no full episodes, the series had a presence during the 2020-21 NHL regular season.

Hometown Hockey Tour Stops

Notes

 : On March 11, 2020, the remaining dates on the Rogers Hometown Hockey Tour were cancelled due to concerns resulting from the COVID-19 pandemic, with the intention of the remaining episodes originating from the Sportsnet studio in Toronto. On March 12, 2020, the NHL announced the suspension of the 2019–20 season due to the coronavirus pandemic.
 : On November 10, 2021, Rogers announced the Sudbury stop scheduled for November 15 was postponed due to concerns resulting from the COVID-19 pandemic.
 : On December 13, 2021, the Hometown Hockey broadcast from Sydney took place as scheduled, but the live game between the Calgary Flames and the Chicago Blackhawks was postponed due to COVID-19 protocols involving the Flames. No other games were scheduled on that date.
 : On December 16, 2021, Rogers announced the pausing of all tour stops through the end of January 2022 due to concerns resulting from the COVID-19 pandemic. Regularly-scheduled broadcasts will instead originate from the Sportsnet studio in Toronto. The live game between the Montreal Canadiens and the New York Islanders on December 20, 2021, was postponed due to the league-wide decision to postpone all cross-border games through December 23 amid COVID-19 concerns. All NHL games scheduled for December 27, 2021 were postponed due to a league-wide pause amid COVID-19 concerns. The two games originally scheduled for January 3, 2022 (Carolina at Toronto, Minnesota at Ottawa) were postponed due to capacity restrictions for games played in Ontario. The Rogers Hometown Hockey broadcast would be replaced by the MSG feed of the game between the Edmonton Oilers and the New York Rangers.

References

2014 Canadian television series debuts
2010s Canadian sports television series
2020s Canadian sports television series
Sportsnet
Sportsnet shows
Rogers Communications